Chojnica may refer to the following villages in Poland:

Chojnica, Greater Poland Voivodeship
Chojnica, Warmian-Masurian Voivodeship (north Poland)